A hromada is a basic unit of administrative division in Ukraine, similar to a municipality. It was established by the Government of Ukraine on 12 June 2020. Similar terms exist in Poland (gromada) and in Belarus (hramada). The literal translation of this term is "community", similarly to the terms used in western European states, such as Germany (Gemeinde), France (commune) and Italy (comune).

History 
In history of Ukraine and Belarus, hromadas appeared first as village communities, which gathered their meetings for discussing and resolving current issues. In the 19th century, there were a number of political organizations of the same name, particularly in Belarus.

Prior to 2020, the basic units of administrative division in Ukraine were rural councils, settlement councils and city councils, which were often referred to by the generic term hromada.

The Constitution of Ukraine and some other laws, including the "Law on local self-governance", delegate certain rights and obligations for hromadas. Types of hromadas include cities, urban-type settlements, rural settlements, and villages. In his draft constitutional amendments of June 2014, President Petro Poroshenko proposed changing the administrative divisions of Ukraine, which he felt should include oblasts, raions and hromadas.On 5 February 2015, the Verkhovna Rada (legislature of Ukraine) adopted the law "On voluntary association of territorial communities". The law created new "amalgamated hromadas", whereby various types of hromadas, including settlement councils, rural councils and cities of district significance can merge to form a new unified administrative unit. New local elections in these united territorial communities have since been held.
On 12 June 2020, the government of Ukraine established the basic level of administrative division of Ukraine covering its whole territory except for Crimea. All previously-established amalgamated hromadas, as well as pre-existing hromadas, were subsumed by new units called simply hromadas or territorial communities.

Administrative tasks and objectives 

Each hromada carries out two types of task: own and commissioned. Own tasks are public tasks exercised by self-government, which serve to satisfy the needs of the community. The tasks can be twofold:

 compulsory – where the municipality cannot decline to carry out the tasks, and must set up a budget to carry them out in order to provide the inhabitants with the basic public benefits
 optional – where the municipality can carry them out in accordance with available budgetary means, set out only to specific local needs (on the hromada's own responsibility and budget).

Own objectives 
Own high objectives include matters such as spatial harmony, real estate management, environmental protection and nature conservation, water management, country roads, public streets, bridges, squares and traffic systems, water supply systems and source, the sewage system, removal of urban waste, water treatment, maintenance of cleanliness and order, sanitary facilities, dumps and council waste, supply of electric and thermal energy and gas, public transport, health care, welfare, care homes, subsidised housing, public education, cultural facilities including public libraries and other cultural institutions, historic monuments conservation and protection, the sports facilities and tourism including recreational grounds and devices, marketplaces and covered markets, green spaces and public parks, communal graveyards, public order and safety, fire and flood protection with equipment maintenance and storage, maintaining objects and devices of the public utility and administrative buildings, pro-family policy including social support for pregnant women, medical and legal care, supporting and popularising the self-government initiatives and cooperation within the commune including with non-governmental organizations, interaction with regional communities from other countries, etc.

Commissioned tasks 
Commissioned tasks cover the remaining public tasks resulting from legitimate needs of the state, commissioned by central government for the units of local government to implement. The tasks are handed over on the basis of statutory by-laws, charters and regulations, or by way of agreements between the self-government units and central-government administration.

List of hromadas

References

Subdivisions of Ukraine
 
2020 establishments in Ukraine